is a Japanese gag comedy manga series written and illustrated by Yūji Nagai. it was serialized in Shogakukan's CoroCoro Comic magazine from January 15, 2015, to October 15, 2018, and has been compiled into seven tankōbon volumes on September 28, 2017. An anime television series adaptation by OLM, Inc. aired from April 15 to December 16, 2017. Crunchyroll later added the series for its streaming service.

Story
The story centers around a mole elementary school teacher called Pascal who is so dumb that he cannot even write his own name correctly. Pascal is whimsical and he does whatever he wants in his classroom.

Characters

A Pascal "form" similar in several ways to the Dragon Ball Z "Super Saiyan" form, the transformation to Super Pascal form is triggered by intense anger, increased gold grease, sneeze and other things.

A minuscule Pascal with a size one one-hundredth of the "normal" Pascal.

A Pascal-Like creature found in the moon. The most notable difference from Pascal Sensei is that "Junior" has only one, central eye. Several "Juniors" were found on the Moon. One was brought to Earth by Pascal as his "son". Junior showed remarkably swift progression at school, becoming a first-class student in the second hour, taking over the role of Sensei (teacher) in the third hour, and taking over the role of Principal in the fourth hour. In the attempt to "dethrone" Junior, Pascal attempts various strategems, which cause Junior to both multiply and transform into various sorts of persons (delinquents, models, old men, etc.)

An older man wearing a Pascal costume, he stands in for Pascal when Pascal is absent.

Boy student in charge of Tsukkomi of this work.
Basically he is a common sense person with a serious personality, but there are many times to make a neta such as becoming naked often.

Hayato's classmate, and similarly a "common sense" sort of student. She sports a pink ponytail. When it comes to battle, Chika transforms into Super Chika (again: extremely similar to Dragon Ball Z's "Super Saiyan") and displays an alternate, fairly aggressive side to her personality.

Hayato's Classmate. A surprisingly muscular elementary school student. Although there are few appearances in the manga, the character appears regularly in the anime. Iwata is a well-behaved student but is always eager to accept a challenge to a fight or other physical contest.

A very rich and egotistical transfer student who often competes with Pascal (instead of supporting Pascal, which is what the other students typically do). Like Pascal and Chika, Steve also transforms (into Super Steve).

A Transfer's Student. of a robot who has transferred to one group for 4 years.

I was Transferred to One's Group. for 4 years (In anime I was a group of four years from the beginning, but it was a school trip before Pascal's Came). A bad student riding a motorcycle.
I usually wear an iron mask and my real face seems to be a Very Beautiful's Girl.

Anime's Original Character. Girls's Student. in one group for 4 years. I wear glasses and have a calm personality.
I like the big game always playing with hand-held game machines, and its skills are also top notch.

Others's Characters

Merciful's Small Principal.

A Four-Year, One-Time Classroom's Teacher. It has been told from the mouth of the principal that he quit suddenly (In anime it is revealed the reason "It became YouTuber").

A Person who is believed to invented an unannounced test. It seems that "Unplugged" in the unannounced test comes from his name.

Steve's Father.

List of episodes

Video games 
A video game titled  was developed and published by Konami for the Nintendo 3DS in 2017.

References

External links
 Anime official website 
 

2017 anime television series debuts
Shogakukan manga
Shogakukan franchises
Children's manga
CoroCoro Comic
Anime series based on manga
OLM, Inc.
TBS Television (Japan) original programming
Mainichi Broadcasting System original programming
Comedy anime and manga